SLC35F6 is a protein that in humans is encoded by the SLC35F6 gene. The orthologue in mice is 4930471M23Rik.

Model organisms

				
Model organisms have been used in the study of C2orf18 function. A conditional knockout mouse line, called 4930471M23Riktm1a(EUCOMM)Wtsi was generated as part of the International Knockout Mouse Consortium program — a high-throughput mutagenesis project to generate and distribute animal models of disease to interested scientists — at the Wellcome Trust Sanger Institute.

Male and female animals underwent a standardized phenotypic screen to determine the effects of deletion. Twenty two tests were carried out on mutant mice, but no significant abnormalities were observed.

References

External links

Further reading

Genes mutated in mice